In Computer Science, in the field of databases, non-lock concurrency control is a concurrency control method used in relational databases without using locking.

There are several non-lock concurrency control methods, which involve the use of timestamps on transaction to determine transaction priority:

 Optimistic concurrency control
 Timestamp-based concurrency control
 Multiversion concurrency control

See also
 Concurrency pattern
 InterBase
 Lock-free and wait-free algorithms

Concurrency control
Transaction processing